Palacio de Congresos de Maspalomas is an indoor arena in San Bartolomé de Tirajana, Gran Canaria, Canary Islands.  It currently holds 5,000 spectators and hosts indoor sporting events such as tennis.

External links
https://www.expomeloneras.com/en/

Indoor arenas in Spain
Tennis venues in Spain
Sports venues in the Canary Islands
Buildings and structures in Gran Canaria